The following are the national records in speed skating in Germany maintained by the Deutsche Eisschnelllauf-Gemeinschaft (DESG).

Men

Women

References

External links
 DESG web site

National records in speed skating
Speed skating-related lists
Records
Speed skating
Speed skating